Erin Bow (born April 1, 1972) (née Noteboom) is an American-born Canadian author.

Biography

Early life
Erin Noteboom was born in Des Moines, Iowa, and raised in Omaha, Nebraska. She had one sibling, a younger sister named Wendy. As a child, she was interested in science, writing, and exploring the woods. In her eighth grade year, Noteboom moved from a suburb in Des Moines to a suburb in Omaha. She then attended Mercy High School and graduated in 1990. In high school, she founded the math club and was the captain of the debate team.

She graduated from Creighton University, where she studied physics as a major and writing as a minor. Noteboom chose physics because she believed that it was "easier to become a self-taught writer rather than a self-taught physicist."

Professional life 
After her undergraduate, Noteboom attended a doctoral program in particle physics in Twin Cities, Minnesota. As part of her research, she worked a summer student at the European Organization for Nuclear Research (CERN) near Geneva, Switzerland.

During graduate school, Noteboom was diagnosed with a brain tumor. Though doctors initially thought the tumor was fatal, it was ultimately found to be a removable glioma. This diagnosis contributed to a change of priorities for Noteboom, leading her to drop out of graduate school and return full-time to poetry.

She wrote poetry and a memoir before focusing on writing young adult works. During this time, she worked various jobs but all related to her passion as a writer. She was the poetry editor for the New Quarterly and organised writing workshops in Kitchener, Ontario. She also worked as a part-time writer at the Perimeter Institute for Theoretical Physics and participated in the Vancouver Writers Fest Writer-in-Residence program at Rossland Summit School.

Personal life 
In 1997, Noteboom moved to Canada. There, she married fellow author and Canadian James Bow, and changed her name to Erin Bow. In 2005, her younger sister, a painter named Wendy Ewell, drowned. Bow lives with her husband, two children, and two pets in Kitchener, Ontario, Canada. She writes in a modified backyard shed and enjoys cooking.

Works

Fiction

Novels 
In 2010, Bow published her first novel, Plain Kate, in which a wood carver's daughter faces suspicion from fellow townsfolk for her wood carving abilities. The book is also known as Wood Angel in the UK. In 2013, Bow published her second full-length novel, Sorrow's Knot.

Prisoners of Peace series 
Prisoners of Peace is a book series set in a future dystopia on the prairies of Saskatchewan. Children of rulers are hostages to be killed if their country goes to war. The hostages are kept together in a school and must obey the governing AIs who manage it. The first book, The Scorpion Rules (2015), follows Greta Gustafsen Stuart, the Duchess of Halifax and Crown Princess of the Pan Polar Confederacy as she navigates the dystopia. The Swan Riders (2016) is the second book in the series.

Short fiction 
Collaborating with her husband James Bow, Erin Bow published a short piece of fiction titled "A Stone of the Heart" in 2001. "A Stone of the Heart" was published in Missing Pieces (2001), a collection of Doctor Who stories.

Poetry 

Under her maiden name Erin Noteboom, Bow published two volumes of poetry: Ghost Maps: Poems for Carl Hruska (2003) and Seal Up the Thunder (2005). Her poetry was also published in other collections, including The Malahat Review, PRISM International, Prairie Fire, and online in Rattle.

Other 

Bow published a memoir The Mongoose Diaries: Excerpts from a Mother's First Year (2007) under her maiden name, Erin Noteboom. In 2013, Bow wrote A Defense of Fantasy: Classical Literature v. Modern YA (2013) for YA Interrobang. She also published short essays for the Perimeter Institute of Theoretical Physics. As part of St. Jerome University's Reading Series, Bow gave a talk on the intersection between science and literature. Currently, Bow is working on a new novel and a volume of poetry about science.

Writing influences and themes 
Bow's novels typically depict young adults in a science fiction and fantasy setting. She has written a defense of young adult fantasy, arguing that fantasy books help young adults to fall in love with reading. Bow also likes to write about unsolvable questions.

She takes inspiration from places, such as the prairies she grew up on, Saskatchewan, and the Black Hills in South Dakota. Bow also draws influence from Lakota and Russian folklore. Bow's characters rarely have a default race or sexual orientation. Her themes generally cover the concepts of acting on faith, doing what is right, and being human.

Awards 
Erin Bow's works have received favorable reviews from multiple sources including Kirkus Reviews, The New York Times, The Globe and Mail, The Times, and The Guardian. Bow received recognition for the following works:
 Ghost Maps: Poems for Carl Hruska (2003):
 Received the 2001 CBC (Canadian Broadcasting Corporation) Canadian Literary Award.
 Won the 2003 KW (Kitchener Waterloo) Arts Award – Literary Award. 
 Won the 2004 Acorn-Plantos Award for Peoples Poetry from the Ontario Poetry Society.
 Shortlisted for the 2004 Pat Lowther Memorial Award for best book by a woman.
 Plain Kate (2010): 
 Won the 2011 TD Canadian Children's Literature Award for the English Language.
 Nominated for the 2011 Sunburst Award for Excellence in Canadian Literature of the Fantastic, for Young Adult Work.
 Nominated for the 2011 Canadian Library Association Book of the Year for Children Award.
 Nominated for the 2010 Cybils Award for Young Adult Fantasy & Science Fiction.
 Nominated for a CBC Reader's Choice Award.
 Listed as a 2011 YALSA (Young Adult Library Services Association) Best Fiction for Young Adults book.
 Selected as Kirkus Reviews Best Book of 2010.
 Selected to be part of the Junior Library Guild.
 Sorrow's Knot (2013): 
 Won the 2014 Monica Hughes Award for Science Fiction and Fantasy.
 Nominated for the 2014 Sunburst Award for Excellence in Canadian Literature of the Fantastic, for Young Adult Work.
 Nominated for the 2014 Ruth and Sylvia Schwartz Award for best book for children from the Ontario Arts Foundation.
 Nominated for a CBC Reader's Choice Award. 
 Listed in Kirkus Reviews Best Teen Books of 2013.
 Selected as Quill & Quire's Best Book of 2013.
 The Scorpion Rules (2015):
 Won the 2016 Canadian Library Association Book of the Year for Young Adults Award. 
 Shortlisted for the 2017 Manitoba Young Readers' Choice Award.
 Selected to be part of the Junior Library Guild Fall 2015 High School Selection.
 Listed as Chapters Indigo Best Book of 2015.
 Listed in Kirkus Reviews Best Teen Books of 2015.
 Stand on the Sky (2019)
 Won the Governor General's Award for English-language children's literature

See also
 Plain Kate

References

External links
 Personal Website
 
 
 

1972 births
Living people
Creighton University alumni
Canadian women novelists
Canadian women short story writers
Women writers of young adult literature
Canadian writers of young adult literature
Canadian women children's writers
Women science fiction and fantasy writers
Writers from Des Moines, Iowa
Writers from Omaha, Nebraska
Writers from Kitchener, Ontario
Canadian science fiction writers
Canadian fantasy writers
American emigrants to Canada
Canadian women poets
Governor General's Award-winning children's writers
21st-century Canadian novelists
21st-century Canadian poets
21st-century Canadian women writers
21st-century Canadian short story writers